James McLean (3 April 1934 – 27 August 1995) was a Scottish footballer who played at inside-right for Port Vale, Southport, Wellington Town, and Witton Albion.

Career
Mclean played for Alva Rangers, before joining Port Vale in March 1958. He played three Third Division South games under Norman Low in the 1957–58 season. He did not play another game for the club, and a two-month loan spell with Fourth Division side Southport in January 1960 could not revitalize his career. After being released from his contract at Vale Park at the end of the 1959–60 season, he moved on to Wellington Town of the Southern League, and then Cheshire County League club Witton Albion. He made his Witton debut on 21 January 1961 and ended the 1960–61 season with nine goals in eighteen games. Upon his retirement from the game, he became a keen Port Vale supporter.

Career statistics
Source:

References

Footballers from Stirling
Scottish footballers
Association football inside forwards
Alva Albion Rangers F.C. players
Port Vale F.C. players
Southport F.C. players
Telford United F.C. players
Witton Albion F.C. players
English Football League players
Southern Football League players
1934 births
1995 deaths